Wild Kratts is a live-action/Flash-animated educational preschool television series created by the Kratt brothers, Chris and Martin. The Kratt Brothers Company and 9 Story Media Group produce the show, which is presented by PBS Kids in the United States and by TVOKids in Canada. The show's aim is to educate children about species, biology, zoology, and ecology, and teach kids small ways to make big impacts. It has ties to the Kratts' previous shows, Kratts' Creatures and Zoboomafoo, and contains numerous characters from the latter. Spanning over ten years, Wild Kratts is the longest running program made by the Kratt Brothers. It was also the last show to premiere on the PBS Kids Go! block before the block was discontinued in 2013 in favor of making PBS Kids aimed at all children young and old alike.

The show is broadcast in the United States and Africa (PBS Kids), Canada (TVOntario, Knowledge and Télé-Québec), Latin America, Brazil, Mexico (Clic Clac!) Australia (9Go!), Spain, the United Kingdom (POP), Ireland, Iceland, Slovenia, Croatia, Denmark, France, Germany, Portugal, Belgium, Italy, the Netherlands (Dutch-dubbed versions as Kratts in the Wild), Middle East, Korea, Japan, India and Serbia, Montenegro, Romania, China, Taiwan, New Zealand, Bosnia and Herzegovina and Macedonia in Serbian. The show was a finalist for a Peabody Award and a Television Critics Association Award.

Premise
Each episode begins and ends with a live-action segment of the Kratt brothers describing the characteristics and capabilities of a particular species of animal (which they refer to as its "creature powers") featured in the story. They segue into the episode by asking, "What if we had the powers" of this animal. Then the episode transitions to the animated segment, where the brothers go on expeditions to study animals "living free and in the wild." They usually end up having to rescue the animals from threats caused by confusion on a baby animal's part; general human influence; or from villains such as Zach Varmitech, Gaston Gourmand, Donita Donata and Dabio, or Paisley Paver and Rex. Some episodes aim to change the way some creatures (such as bats and crocodiles) are perceived as threatening.

The Kratt brothers are supported by Aviva Corcovado, a biomechanical engineer who invented "creature power suits" which allow humans to mimic the abilities of animals, and other equipment to aid the brothers in their animal studies and defeating the villains; Koki, a mechanical engineer and computer expert who maintains their flying turtle ship, the Tortuga; and Jimmy Z, who pilots the Tortuga, operates the teleporter to send equipment such as new Creature Power discs to the Kratt brothers, and helps Aviva test her inventions. Along the way, both the team and the viewers learn about the animals as the team learn to use their creature powers to right wrongs or to get out of the situations they are in. They also occasionally enlist the help of the Wild Kratts Kids, children who help the Wild Kratts from their home however they can, whether it is moving animals or helping rebuild habitats, or providing local knowledge about the creature in question.

Episodes

Characters

Main
Martin Kratt (voiced by himself) is a zoologist who likes to give names to animals he finds, allowing the audience to bond with the said animal. His signature clothing color, including his Creature Power suit, is blue. Martin is more the jokester of the two Kratt brothers. He is also often rushing and impulsive, unlike his younger brother Chris. Plus, he is an exceptionally good artist. Martin is slightly disorganized, emotionalized, but is prepared for any situation. In contrast to his brother Chris' climbing skills, Martin is a more experienced swimmer. At times, Martin seems to know more about animals than Chris does, as shown in "Red Panda Rescue" and "Fire Salamander". He also likes to get into the mind of the animal at various times, saying such things as "Be the walrus!" He has a childish heart, due to his fun and humorous nature. He also seemed to have become more technical throughout the show since he created an almost perfect Creature Power disc in "The Erminator".
Chris Kratt (voiced by himself) is the exact opposite of his brother, and the more methodical of the two. His signature clothing color, including his Creature Power suit, is green. Unlike Martin, he likes to take his time testing animals' DNA to understand the animals better and save them from the villains. Chris is organized, intellectual, and calm, but can be narrow-minded, as seen in "A Huge Orange Problem" when he insists that orangutans are incapable of thinking on human levels. He is an experienced climber, although in “Flight of the Draco”, he falls from a tree and temporarily develops acrophobia.
Aviva Corcovado (voiced by Athena Karkanis) is an inventing engineer, and the leader of the Wild Kratts team. She designs and builds all of the fantastic gadgets the Kratts use, including the Creature Power suit which augments a human body to give the wearer the abilities of any animal which she can program into software disks that pop into the suits. She designed the Tortuga, a turtle-shaped jump jet and spacecraft in which the team flies between expeditions and uses as a home base. She also created a matter transporter to pass equipment to the Kratt brothers when they are out on expedition, a miniaturizer, and a time machine. She is kind and she can be confident of her abilities and her opinions. Once she has made up her mind, it takes appealing to her emotions and overwhelming evidence to change it. She is also competitive, rivaling Zach in invention contests, the Kratts, and even nature itself, most notably in "Cheetah Racer", where she bet that she could invent a land vehicle faster than a cheetah. She occasionally wears a purple Creature Power suit, as shown in episodes like "Birds of a Feather", "Groundhog Wake Up Call", "The Amazing Creature Race", and "Praying Mantis".
Koki (voiced by Heather Bambrick from 2011–20, Sabryn Rock from 2021 onwards) is a mechanical engineer and computer expert, Koki works on the computer database of the Tortuga HQ, researches animals for the brothers, and often uses the computer to track the villains via satellite. She manages the communications system of the Tortuga, keeping in touch with Chris and Martin throughout their missions. She sometimes receives signals from other people who want to communicate with the Wild Kratts, and intercepts signals sent by the villains. She is not afraid to speak her mind and tell the truth as she sees it. Her Creature Power Suit color is golden yellow, as shown in episodes like "When Fish Fly", "A Creature Christmas", and "The Amazing Creature Race"; the color was mentioned in the season 6 episode "Wolf Hawks", where she was called Gold Hawk.)
Jimmy Z (voiced by Jonathan Malen) is the pilot of the Tortuga, who operates the ship's teleporter, using his game controller to send items and Creature Power Discs to the Kratts. He sometimes helps Aviva with inventions by handing her the items she needs as she works, which often has hilarious results when he helps her test the prototype. His Creature Pod and scuba gear are both orange. His tail attachment is red, as revealed in "The Great Creature Tail Fail". His mannerisms also mirror those of Shaggy Rogers from the Scooby-Doo franchise.
The Wild Kratts kids are members of the Kratt brothers' worldwide fan club sometimes communicate with the team via internet, and are occasionally called on to render assistance to the team.

Villains

Zach Varmitech (voiced by Zachary Bennett) is a robotics inventor who grew up alongside the Kratts and met Aviva at summer camp. He tries to develop robots and inventions by controlling creatures' minds and then use them as workers or by selling the mind-controlled animals as products, and in certain cases, for his own benefit. He is constantly trying to steal the Kratt brothers' technology. He uses a jet while travelling long distances, and usually rides on the shoulders of a Zachbot otherwise. He is frightened of the dark, as seen in "Platypus Cafe", and does not like it when other villains tell his Zachbots what to do.
Donita Donata (voiced by Eva Almos) is a fashion designer who travels using a pink jet or boat, and is never without the best comforts life can afford. Her main purpose is her clothing line, Donita Donata's Live Jewelry of Nature. She uses a "pose beam" to paralyze live animals so she can sell them as jewelry or clothing, and has also created robotic mannequins which go out and catch animals for her. Donita is symbolic of real world fashion designers who use animal products in the manufactures of their clothing. She is always foiled by the Kratt Bros and never gets the chance to use the desired animal in her fashion designing plans.
Dabio (voiced by Cory Doran) is Donita's muscular and childlike henchman, who tries to help Donita design her fashions, but usually fails to satisfy her. Though usually shown to be unintelligent, Dabio is able to remember facts about animals more correctly than Donita, but in "Mystery of the Mini Monkey Models", he could not say the animal names correctly.
Chef Gaston Gourmand (voiced by Zachary Bennett) is a traveling chef with a Louisiana Cajun accent. He prefers to cook and serve rare or endangered animals, which caused him to lose his chef's license because he was attempting to poach critters. He usually travels in a camper that features a fold-out restaurant, but has also been seen using a jet or boat with a fold-out outdoor restaurant and kitchen. He invites other villains, mostly Donita and Zach, to try his food; this usually ends up with them running away when his captured animals are let loose by the Kratts. Gourmand is symbolic of real-world chefs using animals in their meals.
Paisley Paver (voiced by Julie Lemieux) is a businesswoman and the CEO of Pave Nature Incorporated, who believes that turning natural landscapes into factories and parking lots will create a better world for future generations. She is depicted as determined, impatient, orderly, and bossy, but still respects her intern, Rex. Paisley is symbolic of the real world problem of construction companies building over natural habitats. She gets upset when her plans are foiled by Chris and Martin. In "Spirit Bear" and "Elephant Brains!", she attempted to cause deforestation and chaos.
Rex (voiced by Cory Doran) is Paisley's henchman, who assists her in her plots against the Wild Kratts. Though usually enthusiastic, he is still evil, as he loves to operate Paisley's technology and flatten land for her building sites.

Background and production

Wild Kratts is the latest of the Kratt Brothers' hit television series, preceded by Kratts' Creatures (1996), Zoboomafoo (1999-2001), and Be the Creature (2003-2007). The series combines animation and live action, featuring a donut sequence that asks "What If?", that sets up the cartoon segment and introduces the focus animal (or focus trait/behavior if more than one animal is the focus); the principal cartoon show; and a concluding live-action segment that sums up the cartoon.

Each episode is written by either Chris or Martin Kratt themselves (who also serve as Executive Producers), Eva Almos (who also voices Donita Donata), or Chris Roy. It is filmed in Canada, the United States, and in several countries around the world. PBS dedicated nearly $500,000 to developing the series.

Wild Kratts makes use of comedic devices such as slapstick comedy, as per their previous kids' shows (Kratt's Creatures and Zoboomafoo). The show debuted on January 3, 2011 on most PBS stations, and has currently aired a 6th season with both PBS and TVOntario. The series currently has 158 episodes, 146 of which have aired so far in the United States.

International rights were signed by 9 Story in September 2010, with North American rights being held by Kratt Brothers Company.

PBS Kids often releases episodes out of order. For example, the episode "Polar Bears Don't Dance", which is supposed to be the pilot episode (but airs as the seventh episode on PBS stations), features an art style different from the rest of the series, and was also omitted from the first DVD release. Additionally, it is directed by Luc Chamberland, who did not direct any subsequent episodes. Chamberland worked on animated films such as Space Jam, Quest for Camelot and Joseph: King of Dreams. Foreign countries seem to get future episodes before the United States and Canadian watchers. For example, the episode "Caracal-Minton" was shown in South America before being aired in English.

On October 15, 2012, in the United States and Canada, Season 2 began with four episodes. This is the first season to begin with a view of the Earth before the Kratt brothers are shown introducing the audience. This season focused on the Western Hemisphere, including the Costa Rican rainforest, coral reef, temperate woodlands, and the Sonoran Desert.

On October 25, 2012, the Season 1 finale of the show was shown on PBS, along with all other unaired episodes in the following week.

On January 21, 2013, a special aired which combined two Season 2 episodes called "Speaking Dolphinese" and "Blowfish Blowout". These episodes later aired separately, with "Speaking Dolphinese" airing on February 5, 2013, and "Blowfish Blowout" airing on February 7, 2013, on most stations. The Season 2 finale, "Groundhog Wake-Up Call", was aired on January 31, 2014.

On the week of August 19 to August 23, 2013, Reptile Week came which aired 4 new reptile-themed episodes, including "Gila Monster Under my House", "Roadrunner", "Tortuga Tune Up" and "Rattlesnake Crystal".

On April 7, 2014, in the United States and Canada, Season 3 began with 5 episodes. This is the second season to begin with a view of the Earth before the Kratt brothers are shown introducing the audience. This focuses on habitats of the Western Hemisphere, such as the jungle and forest habitats of Madagascar, beach and coastal habitats of the Caribbean, prairie or Great Plains habitat of the central United States, ocean habitats of the Caribbean, and the cypress swamp habitat of Florida. On July 7, 2014, "Back in Creature Time" aired. On April 20, 2015, a "Spring Special" aired with episodes such as "Chameleons on Target" and "Lemur Stink Fight". The "Summer Safari" started July 1, 2015, with a rerun of "Back in Creature Time", as well as some Madagascar episodes like "Aye, Aye", "Lemur Legs" and other Madagascar episodes, including the episodes of "Fossa Palooza" and "Mini Madagascar" that marked the end of Season 3.

Season 4 premiered on July 29, 2015 in the USA with the release of the first two episodes, "The Last Largest Lobster" and "Stars of the Tides". Habitats featured in this season included Chinese bamboo forests, the Amazon rainforest, the Arctic, and the rocky intertidal zone of the Atlantic Ocean. On November 25, 2015, a holiday special known as "Wild Kratts: A Creature Christmas" was released in the USA. On November 23, 2016, the special "Creatures of the Deep Sea" was released in the USA.

From January 16–20, 2017 new episodes of Season 4 began to air, including "Liturgusa krattorum", "Snowy Owl Invasion" and "Eel-Ectric". "Liturgusa Krattorum" was a special episode dedicated to an event in 2014/15 in which Gavin Svenson discovered an animal by the episode's same name, naming it after Chris and Martin Kratt, for their excellent work on Wild Kratts, as well as their other shows including Be the Creature and Zoboomafoo.

Season 4 concluded in the USA when the remaining 5 episodes ("Archerfish School", "This Orca Likes Sharks", "Baby Tooth and Kid Musky", "Cheetah Adopted" and "Muskox Mania") aired from April 10–14, 2017.

Season 5 premiered on July 24, 2017 in the USA with the release of the two-part special "Wild Kratts Alaska: Hero's Journey", as well as the episodes "Mystery of the North Pole Penguins?" and "Temple of Tigers". This season focuses primarily on habitats such as Europe's Black Forest, and Antarctica, as well as the Indian jungles. Also, a Halloween special, entitled "Wild Kratts Halloween: Creepy Creatures", was released in the USA on October 22, 2018. Season 5 concluded in the USA on January 23, 2019 with the release of the episode "Hercules - The Giant Beetle".

In 2019, Season 6 was announced and began with "Mystery of the Flamingo's Pink."The other episodes in season 6 were about ocelots, white tailed deer, harris hawks, hammerhead sharks, leaf cutter ants, tamarins and marmosets, stingrays, and a movie special about the Amazon rainforest called Amazin Amazon Adventure. Season 6 focuses on the Sonoran Desert, The Amazon Rainforest, the Caribbean Sea and Africa.

After the premiere of “The Great Creature Tail Fail”, on October 7, 2020, the series went into hiatus for 9 months due to the COVID-19 pandemic and the Kratt Brothers focusing more on live appearances. However, it was later announced that a new episode called “Cats and Dogs” would air on July 12, 2021 as part of the sixth season. Unlike the rest of the cast members, though, Heather Bambrick did not reprise her role as Koki due to controversy over Bambrick voicing an African American character. Instead, the part was played by Canadian black actress Sabryn Rock, who has been confirmed to voice Koki in future episodes. "Cats and Dogs" is the only episode to air in 2021 and served as the Season 6 finale. Afterwards, the series went into another hiatus, with no new episodes airing in 2022.

On July 5, 2021, it was announced that the series had started production on season 7, which is premiering the week of May 22, 2023   Additionally, a feature film and autobiography have been confirmed to be in development. The film will mark the first theatrical adaptation of the Kratt Brothers' works.

Broadcast
Wild Kratts airs on PBS Kids in the United States and Africa. In Canada it is shown on TV Ontario in Ontario, Knowledge Network in British Columbia, and Télé-Québec/Le Skwat in Quebec. In Australia, it is shown on GO! (now 9Go!). Season 1 and 2 are available on Netflix Singapore. In the United Kingdom, it is shown on POP. Netflix Canada streams Seasons 3-4.

Reception 
Jacqueline Cutler of The Baltimore Sun wrote, "The best of what PBS kids shows can be."

DVD releases

Creature Adventures – April 5, 2011

"Mom of a Croc"
"Whale of a Squid"
"Aardvark Town"
"Flight of the Draco"
"Mystery of the Squirmy Wormy"
"Platypus Café" 
"Build It Beaver"
"Voyage of the Butterflier XT"
"Honey Seekers"
"Bass Class"

Predator Power – March 20, 2012
"Stuck on Sharks" 
"Mimic"
"Little Howler"
"Raptor Roundup"

Jungle Animals – July 10, 2012
Distributor: Paramount Pictures
"Walk on the Wetside"
"A Huge Orange Problem"
"Birds of a Feather"
"Googly-Eye the Night Guru"

Lost at Sea – January 22, 2013
Distributor: Warner Bros.
"Speaking Dolphinese"
"Blowfish Blowout"

Rainforest Rescue – April 9, 2013
"Rainforest Stew"
"Shadow: The Black Jaguar"

Bugging Out – February 25, 2014
"Secrets of the Spider's Web"
"Attack of the Tree-Eating Aliens"

Tiny Trouble – June 10, 2014
"Termites vs. Tongues"
"Bugs or Monkeys?"

Shark-Tastic! – April 14, 2015
"Octopus Wildkratticus"
"Tortuga Tune Up"
"Speaking Dolphinese"
"Stuck on Sharks"

Super Sprinters – June 23, 2015
"Falcon City"
"Cheetah Racer"

Australian Adventures – January 6, 2016
"Koala Balloon"
"Kickin' It With the 'Roos"
"Platypus Café"

Wild Animal Babies – May 3, 2016
"Elephant in the Room"
"Bad Hair Day"
"Zig-Zagged"
"Let the Rhinos Roll!"

Wild Reptiles – August 23, 2016 
"The Gecko Effect"
"Crocogator Contest"
"Rattlesnake Crystal"
"Chameleons on Target"

A Creature Christmas – October 4, 2016

Panda-Monium – April 2017
"Panda Power-Up"
"Red Panda Rescue"
"Colors of China"
"Snowy Owl Invasion"

Wild Winter Creatures – October 10, 2017
"Polar Bears Don't Dance"
"Mystery of the Weird Looking Walrus"
"Journey to the Subnivean Zone"
"Musk Ox Mania"

Triple Feature: Rainforest Rescue, Lost at Sea, and Predator Power:
Stuck on Sharks
Mimic
Little Howler
Raptor Round Up
Speaking Dolphinese
Blowfish Blowout
Rainforest Stew
Shadow the Black Jaguar

Around the World Adventure: With 22 episodes:
Tazzy Chris
Kerhonk!
Search for the Florida Panther
Golden Bamboo Lemur
Tenrec Treasure Hunt
Mimic
Back in Creature Time:Day of the Dodo
Back in Creature Time:Tasmanian Tiger
 Liturgusa Krattorum
Eel-lectric!
Cheetah Adopted
Temple of Tigers
The Dhole Duplicator
 A Huge Orange Problem
Shadow the Black Jaguar
The Food Chain Game
Cheetah Racer
Rainforest Stew
Sloth Bear Suction
The Amazing Creature Race
Caracal-Minton
Amazin' Amazon Adventure!

Madagascar Madness:
Lemur Legs
Lemur Stink Fight
Fossa-Palooza
Mini Madagascar

Adventures on the African Savanna
 The Food Chain Game
 Creature Power Challenge

Cats and Dogs
 Cats and Dogs
 Spots in the Desert
 Adapto the Coyote
 Little Howler

The Briny Blue Sea
"Sea Otter Swim"
"Aye-Aye"
"Osprey"
"Puffin Rescue"

Creepy Creatures 
"Masked Bandits"
"Creepy Creatures"

PBS Kids: 20 Snowy Tales
Snow Runners

PBS Kids: 20 Sports Stories
Cheetah Racer

PBS Kids: 20 Furry Tales
Slider the Otter

PBS Kids: 15 Sports Tales
Road Runner
City Hoppers!

PBS Kids: 15 Frozen Tales
Under Frozen Pond
Musk Ox Mania

PBS Kids: Ocean Adventures
Rocket Jaw: Rescuer of the Reef
Capture the Fishmobile

PBS Kids: 15 Pet-Tastic Tails!
Little Howler

PBS Kids: 20 Music Tales
Birds of a Feather

PBS Kids: 20 Incredible Tales
Fireflies
Pangolin Rescue

PBS Kids: Happy Birthday!
Quillber's Birthday Present

PBS Kids: Christmas Collection
A Creature Christmas

PBS KIDS: Play Date Triple Feature!
"Mystery of the Flamingo's Pink"
"Deer Buckaroo"
"Real Ant Farm"
"Mystery of the Mini Monkey Models"

PBS KIDS: Secret Superheroes!
"Great Froggyback Ride"

PBS KIDS: Just A Little Bit Spooky!
"The Cobra King"

Wildest Animal Adventures
"Mom of a Croc"
"Whale of a Squid"
"Aardvark Town"
"Flight of the Draco"
"Mystery of the Squirmy Wormy"
"Platypus Café"
"Build It Beaver"
"Voyage of the Butterflier XT"
"Honey Seekers"
"Bass Class"
"Stuck on Sharks"
"Mimic"
"Little Howler"
"Raptor Roundup"
"Walk on the Wetside"
"A Huge Orange Problem"
"Birds of a Feather"
"Googly-Eye the Night Guru"
"Speaking Dolphinese"
"Blowfish Blowout"

Other media
A Wild Kratts magazine appeared in Wal-Mart in October 2017. It had animals from when this show started in 2011 to about until 2017.

In 2016, Whole Foods Market introduced a line of products including crackers, vitamins, and soap carrying the WILD KRATTS branding.

Two theatrical live shows based on the animated series premiered at an unknown time at a large stage. The first stage show featured the Kratt Brothers leaping out of the animation and interacting with the audience, and later using their Creature Power Suits to rescue the miniaturizer from Zach Varmitech. A theatrical sequel to that live show in 2019 titled Wild Kratts Live 2.0: Activate Creature Power! premiered at a live stage. The live stage performance had featured the live-action Kratt Brothers shrinking down and exploring, only to later rescue their Creature Power discs from Zach.

References

External links
 
 
 Pages on TVO Kids (TVO Parents), PBS Kids, Discovery Kids Asia, POP, Super3
 

2011 American television series debuts
2010s American animated television series
2020s American animated television series
2011 Canadian television series debuts
2010s Canadian animated television series
2020s Canadian animated television series
American animated television spin-offs
American children's animated adventure television series
American children's animated comedy television series
American children's animated education television series
American flash animated television series
American television series with live action and animation
Animated television series about brothers
Canadian animated television spin-offs
Canadian children's animated adventure television series
Canadian children's animated comedy television series
Canadian children's animated education television series
Canadian flash animated television series
Canadian television series with live action and animation
English-language television shows
Nature educational television series
PBS Kids shows
PBS original programming
TVO original programming
Television series by 9 Story Media Group
Television series created by Chris Kratt
Television series created by Martin Kratt